The players auction for the 2012 Bangladesh Premier League was held on 19 January 2012 at the Hotel Radisson, Dhaka. Each franchise can sign a total of 10 local players and 8 foreign players, and can play up to 5 foreign players in each match. Each franchise will also have one domestic icon player in their team. Players were allowed to set their base price between $20,000 to $100,000.

Player list

Domestic players
Domestic players with top three base prices for the auction are listed below:
Icon players will receive 15% salary more than the highest cost local player.
Icon players ($210,000):

  Shahriar Nafees (Barisal Burners)
  Tamim Iqbal (Chittagong Kings)
  Mohammad Ashraful (Dhaka Gladiators)
  Shakib Al Hasan (Khulna Royal Bengal)
  Mushfiqur Rahim (Duronto Rajshahi)
  Alok Kapali (Sylhet Royals)

Grade A ($45,000):

  Mahmudullah
  Abdur Razzak
  Nasir Hossain
  Junaid Siddique
  Imrul Kayes
  Mashrafe Mortaza

Grade B ($30,000):

  Nazimuddin
  Raqibul Hasan
  Elias Sunny
  Suhrawadi Shuvo
  Rubel Hossain
  Shafiul Islam
  Nazmul Hossain
  Farhad Reza
  Mithun Ali
  Jahurul Islam
  Shahadat Hossain
  Naeem Islam

International players
International players with one of the top two base prices for the auction are listed below:
Grade A ($100,000):

  Dirk Nannes
  Matt Prior
  Scott Styris
  Shoaib Malik
  Abdul Razzaq
  Azhar Mahmood
  Shahid Afridi
  Chaminda Vaas
  Muttiah Muralitharan
  Ajantha Mendis
  Herschelle Gibbs
  Chris Gayle
  Kieron Pollard
  Dwayne Bravo
  Marlon Samuels
  Ramnaresh Sarwan
  Kemar Roach
  Brendan Taylor

Grade B ($50,000):

  Brad Hodge
  James Tredwell
  Graham Onions
  James Foster
  Peter Trego
  Ian Blackwell
  Sajid Mahmood
  Geraint Jones
  Gary Keedy
  Niall O'Brien
  Lou Vincent
  Danish Kaneria
  Kamran Akmal
  Rana Naved-ul-Hasan
  Taufeeq Umar
  Yasir Arafat
  Raza Hasan
  Sanath Jayasuriya
  Thilina Kandamby
  Andre Nel
  Andrew Hall
  Sulieman Benn
  Lionel Baker
  Dinesh Ramdin
  Fidel Edwards
  Dwayne Smith
  Hamilton Masakadza
  Elton Chigumbura

Sold players
List of bought players.

Unsold players
These players remained unsold at the auction.

  Aaron Finch
  Dirk Nannes
  Graham Manou
  Riki Wessels
  Ryan Campbell
  Abishek Mitra
  Abu Jayed
  Abul Bashar
  Abul Hasan
  Delwar Hossain
  Ejaz Ahmed
  Fazle Mahmud
  Imtiaz Hossain
  Jubair Ahmed
  Kamrul Islam
  Mahbubul Alam
  Mahbubul Karim
  Mehrab Hossain jnr
  Mohammad Sharif
  Mohammad Shahzada
  Monir Hossain
  Murad Khan
  Nafees Iqbal
  Nasir Ussin Faruque
  Rajin Saleh
  Rokibul Hasan
  Rezaul Karim
  Robiul Islam
  Rony Talukdar
  Shahin Hossain
  Shakar Ahmed
  Shuvashish Roy
  Taijul Islam
  Tapash Baisya
  Tasamul Haque
  Taskin Ahmed
  Tushar Imran
  Chris Schofield
  Darren Stevens
  Dimitri Mascarenhas
  Graham Onions
  Geraint Jones
  Ian Blackwell
  Jason Roy
  James Hildreth
  James Tredwell
  Josh Cobb
  Matt Prior
  Sajid Mahmood
  Scott Borthwick
  Tom Maynard
  Irfan Ahmed
  Thomas Odoyo
  Gerrie Snyman
  Andre Adams
  Bruce Kruger
  Hamish Marshall
  Lou Vincent
  Scott Styris
  Adnan Akmal
  Azhar Mahmood
  Danish Kaneria
  Taufeeq Umar
  Yasir Hamid
  Andre Nel
  Andrew Hall
  Claude Henderson
  Johann Myburgh
  Ajantha Mendis
  Chamara Silva
  Chaminda Vaas
  Dilhara Fernando
  Farveez Maharoof
  Jehan Mubarak
  Kaushalya Weeraratne
  Nuwan Zoysa
  Thilina Kandamby
  Simon Jones
  Dinesh Ramdin
  Kemar Roach
  Lionel Baker
  Nikita Miller
  Ramnaresh Sarwan
  Sulieman Benn
  Tino Best
  Hamilton Masakadza
  Elton Chigumbura
  Brendan Taylor

Source:

Post-auction signings

Many franchises signed players after the BPL auction, as replacement of contracted players who are not available to play due to injuries and national commitments. Under BPL rules, the replacements have to be chosen from the pool of players who went unsold in the January auction, and cannot be paid more than the players they are replacing, though they can be paid less.

See also
 2012 Bangladesh Premier League

References

2012 Bangladesh Premier League